The 2018 World RX of Barcelona was the first round of the fifth season of the FIA World Rallycross Championship. The event was held at the Circuit de Barcelona-Catalunya in Montmeló, Catalonia.

Heats

Semi-finals

Semi-Final 1

Semi-Final 2

‡ Loeb initially qualified 13th, however was promoted to a semi-final position following the withdrawal of Kevin Hansen.

Final

Standings after the event

References

External links

|- style="text-align:center"
|width="35%"|Previous race:2017 World RX of South Africa
|width="40%"|FIA World Rallycross Championship2018 season
|width="35%"|Next race:2018 World RX of Portugal
|- style="text-align:center"
|width="35%"|Previous race:2017 World RX of Barcelona
|width="40%"|World RX of Barcelona
|width="35%"|Next race:2019 World RX of Catalunya
|- style="text-align:center"

Barcelona
World RX
World RX
World RX